Balharshah Junction railway station (station code: BPQ) is a railway station serving Ballarpur town, in Chandrapur district of Maharashtra state in India. Established by the Nizam's Guaranteed State Railway, it is now under the Nagpur CR railway division of Central Railway Zone of Indian Railways. It is an important junction on New Delhi–Chennai main line of Indian Railways. It is located at 185 m above sea level and has 5 platforms. The Ballarshah–Wardha–Nagpur section was electrified in 1989.

History
With the completion of the –Balharshah link in 1929, Chennai was directly linked to Delhi.

The –Nagbhir– line was opened for traffic in 1908. The Nagbhir–Rajoli line was opened in 1913 and extended up to Chanda Fort. Work for conversion to  broad gauge of the  narrow-gauge Gondia–Chanda Fort line started in December 1992. The fourth phase covering Nagbhir–Chanda Fort section was opened on 13 January 1999 and the Chanda Fort–Balharshah section was opened from 2 July 1999.

The Ramagundam–Balharshah–Wardha–Nagpur sector was electrified in 1988–89. The Gondia–Nagbhir–Balharshah line was electrified in 2018.

Amenities
The railway station has computerized reservation counters, STD/PCO booth, retiring room, waiting room, vegetarian and non-vegetarian refreshments and book stall.

External links
Trains at Balharshah

References

Nagpur CR railway division
Railway stations in Chandrapur district
Railway stations opened in 1904
Nizam's Guaranteed State Railway